The 1991 FIFA World Youth Championship was the eighth staging of the FIFA World Youth Championship, an international football competition organized by FIFA for men's youth national teams, and the eighth since it was established in 1977 as the FIFA World Youth Tournament. The final tournament took place for the first time in Portugal, between 14 and 30 June 1991. Matches were played across five venues in as many cities: Faro, Braga, Guimarães, Porto and Lisbon. Nigeria originally won the bid to host but was stripped of its right after found guilty for committing age fabrication.

North Korea and South Korea competed for the first time as a united team, although FIFA attributes its historical data to South Korea. Portugal entered the competition as the defending champions, after winning the previous tournament. They reached the final, where a record attendance of 127,000 witnessed the hosts defeat Portuguese-speaking rival Brazil 4–2 on penalties to secure their second consecutive title. The Soviet Union made its last FIFA tournament appearance, as the country was dissolved later that year.

Qualification
In addition to the host team, Portugal, 15 other national teams qualified from six continental tournaments.

1.Teams that made their debut.

Match officials

Africa
 Alhagi Ibrahima Faye
 Mawukpona Hounnake-Kouassi
 Idrissa Sarr

Asia
 Ali Bujsaim
 Kiichiro Tachi
 Wei Jihong

Europe
 Guy Goethals
 Bernd Heynemann
 Leslie Irvine
 João Martins Correia Pinto
 Egil Nervik
 Pierluigi Pairetto
 Sándor Puhl
 Daniel Roudit
 Ryszard Wojcik

North, Central America and Caribbean
 Raúl Domínguez
 Juan Pablo Escobar López
 Robert Sawtell

South America
 Ernesto Filippi
 Francisco Lamolina
 Enrique Marín Gallo
 Renato Marsiglia
 Alberto Tejada

Oceania
 John McConnell

Squads
For a list of all squads that played in the final tournament, see 1991 FIFA World Youth Championship squads

Group stages
The 16 teams were split into four groups of four teams.  Four group winners, and four second-place finishers qualify for the knockout round.

Group A

Group B

Group C

Group D

Knockout stage

Bracket

Quarter-finals

Semi-finals

Third place play-off

Final

Awards

Goalscorers

Serhiy Scherbakov of Soviet Union won the Golden Shoe award for scoring five goals. In total, 82 goals were scored by 54 different players, with none of them credited as own goal.

5 goals
 Serhiy Scherbakov
4 goals
 Giovane Élber
 Pedro Pineda
 Ismael Urzaiz
3 goals
 David Seal
 Paulo Torres
 Pier Luigi Cherubino
2 goals

 Djair Kaye de Brito
 Luíz Fernando
 Marquinhos
 Paulo Nunes
 Andy Awford
 Choi Chol
 Nélson Gama
 Andreas Bild
 Munaf Ramadan

1 goal

 Brad Maloney
 Paul Okon
 Kris Trajanovski
 Marcelo Delgado
 Roberto Molina
 Castro
 Andrei Frascarelli
 Amir Abdel Aziz
 Sami El-Sheshini
 Samir Hussein
 Sami Abdel Halil Ismail
 Mostafa Sadek
 Tamer Sakr
 Bradley Allen
 Brian Byrne
 Paul McCarthy
 Barry O'Connor
 Ambroise Mambo
 Ambroise Seri
 Sylvain Tiehi
 Cho In-Chol
 Álvarez Arcos
 Héctor Hernández
 Bruno Mendoza
 Capucho
 Rui Costa
 Gil Gomes
 João Vieira Pinto
 Serhiy Konovalov
 Sergei Mandreko
 Dmytro Mykhaylenko
 Yevhen Pokhlebayev
 José Mauricio Casas
 Patrik Andersson
 Jonny Rödlund
 Ammar Awad
 Abdul Latif Helou
 Abdullah Mando

Final ranking

References

External links
1991 FIFA World Youth Championship  at FIFA.com
RSSSF > FIFA World Youth Championship > 1991
FIFA Technical Report (Part 1), (Part 2), (Part 3) and (Part 4)

Fifa World Youth Championship, 1991
World
FIFA World Youth Championship
International association football competitions hosted by Portugal
June 1991 sports events in Europe